Lupinus covillei is a species of lupine known by the common name shaggy lupine.

Description
The herbage is coated in long, shaggy hairs. The inflorescence is a raceme of many flowers, sometimes arranged in whorls. Each flower is about a centimeter long and blue in color with a yellowish spot on the banner.

Distribution
Lupinus covillei is endemic to the Sierra Nevada of California, where it grows in moist habitat such as wet depressions in meadows. In the same state it is also abundant in Sequoia, Yosemite and Kings Canyon National Parks.

References

External links
Jepson Manual Treatment - Lupinus covillei
Lupinus covillei Photo gallery

covillei
Endemic flora of California
Flora without expected TNC conservation status